Lancelot "Lance" Hunter is a fictional character appearing in American comic books published by Marvel Comics. He first appeared in Captain Britain Weekly #19 (February 16, 1977) and was created by writer Gary Friedrich and artist Herb Trimpe.

Hunter is a Royal Navy Commander who became Director of S.T.R.I.K.E. before later gaining the rank of Commodore and becoming Joint Intelligence Committee Chair.

The character made his live-action debut in the Marvel Cinematic Universe television series Agents of S.H.I.E.L.D., portrayed by Nick Blood.

Publication history
Created by Gary Friedrich, and first penciled by Herb Trimpe, Hunter made his debut in Captain Britain Weekly #19 on February 16, 1977. He was the UK, and S.T.R.I.K.E., counterpart to Marvel's Nick Fury, Agent of S.H.I.E.L.D. Hunter continued to appear within the pages of Captain Britain Weekly throughout the rest of 1977 but would not appear on panel again until 30 years later in the Civil War: Battle Damage Report one-shot in 2007.

Fictional character biography
After Tod Radcliffe, a Special Tactical Reserve for International Key Emergencies traitor secretly working for the Red Skull, was exposed, Commander Lance Hunter introduced himself as the Director of S.T.R.I.K.E. to Nick Fury. The agents of S.T.R.I.K.E. and S.H.I.E.L.D. worked together to track down the Red Skull's Nazi activities. It was then revealed that Red Skull had kidnapped the British Prime Minister, James Callaghan and had set a germ bomb over London to be detonated at midnight. Hunter, aided by Fury and the pair's respective superheroes, Captain Britain and Captain America, stopped the bomb which had been placed on the minute hand of Big Ben and thwarted the Red Skull's plans.

Hunter aided Captain Britain in the capture of villain Lord Hawk, and took the injured hero to S.T.R.I.K.E. headquarters to recover. However, while there Captain Britain's spirit was summoned away by Merlin where he did battle with a monstrous giant. Injuries suffered in this spirit realm transferred to the Captain's real body. Hunter ordered the doctors to keep working to save the stricken hero. When Hunter finally admitted defeat at the bed side of Captain Britain's lifeless body, the Captain returned to the real world and left the base.

Sometime after S.T.R.I.K.E. was dissolved, Hunter gained the rank of commodore and was seen alongside Contessa Valentina Allegro de Fontaine, and Alistaire Stuart briefing British superhumans on the details of the British Superhuman Registration Act. Following the Skrull invasion of Earth, and the revelation that the then-Joint Intelligence Committee chair person was in fact a Skrull impostor, Hunter was made the new JIC Chair.

Hunter agreed to let S.H.I.E.L.D. European Division take charge of the cleanup when Mys-Tech was defeated, as MI-13 didn't have the resources. He approved keeping MI-13 out of the loop entirely, which infuriated Pete Wisdom when he found out.

Hunter the appears as a supporting character in the 2016 Mockingbird series. He is reintroduced as a much younger man and given a romantic connection to Mockingbird, echoing the character's live-action adaptation in Agents of S.H.I.E.L.D..

Powers and abilities
Lance Hunter has years of Naval training, with an expertise in munitions,  well as experience in espionage from working for British Intelligence.

Other versions
In Earth-22110, Lance Hunter is Rifleman. He is a Captain Britain Corps member.

In other media

Lance Hunter appears as a regular character in the second season of the Marvel Cinematic Universe TV series Agents of S.H.I.E.L.D., portrayed by Nick Blood. He debuted in the season two premiere "Shadows" as a decorated member of the SAS turned freelance mercenary working for Phil Coulson's reconstituted S.H.I.E.L.D. in a team under the leadership of his old acquaintance, Isabelle Hartley. In the following episode, "Heavy is the Head", Coulson formally recruits him as a S.H.I.E.L.D. agent. In the episode "A Hen in the Wolf House", Hunter's ex-wife Bobbi Morse joins the team, causing tension between the two before they eventually reconcile. In season three, Hunter and Morse are forced to leave S.H.I.E.L.D. after they are caught by Russian forces in Siberia and almost cause an international incident. He returns in the fifth season episode "Rewind" to get Leo Fitz out of military custody and help him reunite him with his team after they are sent to the future.

Late into Agents of S.H.I.E.L.D. season two, it was reported that Blood would appear in a spin-off series as Hunter along with Adrianne Palicki as Bobbi Morse. However, the development of the spin-off series was put on hold indefinitely, which meant that Hunter and Morse remained series regulars for season 3. Variety announced that the series had been ordered by the network under the title Marvel's Most Wanted, but on May 12, 2016, ABC announced that the show would not be produced.

References

External links

Characters created by Gary Friedrich
Characters created by Herb Trimpe
Comics characters introduced in 1977
Fictional SIS agents
Fictional commanders
Fictional Royal Navy personnel
Fictional Special Air Service personnel
Fictional mercenaries in comics
Marvel Comics television characters
Marvel UK characters
S.H.I.E.L.D. agents